Adorp is a village in the municipality of Het Hogeland, Netherlands. It is located about 6 km north of Groningen. Until 1990, Adorp was a separate municipality, however the seat was in Sauwerd.

History 
Adorp started in the middle ages as a settlement in a bend in the River . Later, the river moved westwards. It was first mentioned as Artharpe in 1371. The origin of the name is unclear, it seems to read river (A) village (dorp), however the earliest names started with Ar. The church dates from 1667. In 1840, it was home to 1,030 people.

Gallery

References

External links

 Official website (in Dutch)

Former municipalities of Groningen (province)
Populated places in Groningen (province)
Het Hogeland